Andre Carter II (born June 2, 2000) is an American outside linebacker for the Army Black Knights.

Early life and high school career
Carter initially grew up in California before his family moved to Missouri City, Texas. After high school, he completed a postgraduate year at Cheshire Academy in Cheshire, Connecticut.

College career
Carter did not play in any of Army's games as a freshman. He played in ten games as a sophomore and had 14 tackles with one sack, one forced fumble, and one interception. As a junior, Carter finished second in the nation with 15.5 sacks and had 44 total tackles, 18.5 tackles for loss, and four forced fumbles.

References

External links
Army Black Knights bio

Living people
American football outside linebackers
Army Black Knights football players
Year of birth missing (living people)
Players of American football from California
Players of American football from Texas
People from Missouri City, Texas
Cheshire Academy alumni